The 1905–06 William & Mary Indians men's basketball team represented the College of William & Mary in intercollegiate basketball during the 1905–06 season. The team finished the season with a 4–1 record. This was the first season in program history for William & Mary, whose nickname is now "Tribe."

Schedule

|-
!colspan=9 style="background:#006400; color:#FFD700;"| Regular season

Source

References

William & Mary Tribe men's basketball seasons
William And Mary Indians
William and Mary Indians Men's Basketball Team
William and Mary Indians Men's Basketball Team